The 1975 Munich WCT – Singles was an event of the 1975 Munich WCT tennis tournament and was played in Munich, West Germany between 10 March through 16 March 1975. Frew McMillan was the defending champion, but lost in the first round. First-seeded Arthur Ashe won the singles title, defeating Björn Borg in the final, 6–4, 7–6.

Seeds

Draw

Finals

Top half

Bottom half

References

External links
 ITF tournament edition details

Munich WCT
Munich WCT